Post Oak is an unincorporated community in Carter County, Oklahoma, United States.

A Comanche Indian mission, Post Oak Mission, was established in 1896 in Post Oak by the Mennonite Brethren Churches of North America. In 1957, in order to make room for a missile range, the mission and its cemetery were relocated to Indiahoma. Today the mission is known as the Post Oak Mennonite Brethren Church.

External links 
 YouTube video of Post Oak Mission in 1945

References

Unincorporated communities in Oklahoma